Arthur Shuckburgh Collins (31 December 1832 – 26 September 1911), later spelling his surname Collyns, was a 19th-century Member of Parliament from Nelson, New Zealand.

Early life and education
Collins was born on 31 December 1832 in Devon, son of William Wrangham Collins (1799–1880) and Henrietta (1799–1861), daughter of Reverend Charles Shuckburgh, of The Moot, Downton, Wiltshire. He received a 'good education'. The family emigrated to Nelson on the Pekin from London, arriving on 15 January 1850. In his younger years, he excelled in sports.

Career

He was a Provincialist, but once elected, he changed his mind and became an ardent supporter of the abolition of the provinces. He was a member of the Nelson Provincial Council from 13 Nov 1869 to 28 June 1872, representing the Nelson electorate. From March to June 1870, he was a member of the Nelson executive council.

Personal life

On 29 September 1855, at Christchurch, Collins married Catherine Anne, daughter of Thomas Isaacson, of Brighton, East Sussex, and niece and adopted daughter of Reverend J. F. Isaacson, rector of Freshwater, Isle of Wight. They had three daughters: Henrietta, Adelaide, and Emily. Following Catherine's death, he married Erica Elspeth, daughter of James Mackay, of Drumduan, Nelson, New Zealand; they had five sons (the eldest being the teacher and cricketer John Ulric Collins) and five daughters.  His daughter, Erica Catherine, married John Sharp, the son of John Sharp, in 1887.

In the 1870s, he changed the spelling of his surname to Collyns. He lived at Hillwood, near Nelson, and at Mount Fyffe, at Kaikōura.

Collyns died in Nelson on 26 September 1911. He is buried, as are his wives, at Wakapuaka Cemetery.

References

External link

Obituary in the Nelson Evening Mail

|-

1832 births
1911 deaths
Members of the New Zealand House of Representatives
Burials at Wakapuaka Cemetery
New Zealand MPs for South Island electorates
English emigrants to New Zealand
19th-century New Zealand politicians
Members of Nelson provincial executive councils
Members of the Nelson Provincial Council